Nail Munirovich Magzhanov (born 29 July 1980) is a Russian professional football coach and a former player. He is an assistant coach with FC Volgar Astrakhan.

Club career
He played 6 seasons in the Russian Football National League for FC Volgar Astrakhan.

Honours
 Russian Second Division Zone South best midfielder: 2004.

References

External links
 

1980 births
Sportspeople from Astrakhan
Living people
Russian footballers
Association football midfielders
FC Rotor Volgograd players
FC Volgar Astrakhan players
FC Sokol Saratov players
FC Sakhalin Yuzhno-Sakhalinsk players